Ellenborough could refer to:
 Ellenborough, Cumbria, England
 Ellenborough, New South Wales, Australia
 Ellenborough Park, Weston-super-Mare, a park in Somerset, England
 Baron Ellenborough, a United Kingdom honorific title